D'Andra Yvette Moss (born February 21, 1988) is an American (until September 2016) and Ukrainian (since September 2016) basketball player for Mersin Büyükşehir and the Ukrainian national team.

She participated at the EuroBasket Women 2017.

Virginia Commonwealth  statistics 

Source

References

1988 births
Living people
American women's basketball players
Ukrainian women's basketball players
Point guards
Ukrainian expatriate basketball people in Turkey
Mersin Büyükşehir Belediyesi women's basketball players
American expatriate basketball people in Ukraine
Naturalized citizens of Ukraine
American emigrants to Ukraine
American expatriate basketball people in Spain
Ukrainian expatriate basketball people in Spain
Tarbes Gespe Bigorre players